An O mark, known as marujirushi or maru in Japan and gongpyo (ball mark) in Korea, is the name of the symbols "◯" or "⭕" used to represent affirmation in East Asia, similar to its Western equivalent of the checkmark ("✓"). Its opposite is the X mark ("✗" or "×").

Extended system
It is common in Japan to employ other symbols to express non-binary grading beyond just "yes/no" or "right/wrong." A bullseye (nijūmaru ) "◎" is often used for "excellent," while a triangle (sankaku ) "△" means "so-so" or "partially applicable." This "◎-○-△-×" system is widely known in Japan, and can be used without explanation. Other ad-hoc usages exist, but they require legends explaining every symbol’s meaning.

The hanamaru is a variant of the O mark. It is typically drawn as a spiral surrounded by rounded flower petals, suggesting a flower. It is frequently used in praising or complimenting children, and the motif often appears in children's characters and logos.

The hanamaru is frequently written on tests if a student has achieved full marks or an otherwise outstanding result. It is sometimes used in place of an O mark in grading written response problems if a student's answer is especially good. Some teachers will add more rotations to the spiral the better the answer is.

Unicode

Unicode provides various related symbols, including:

 has both text and emoji presentations, as shown in the table. It defaults to emoji presentation.

The emoji  looks similar to hanamaru, although it represents a rubber stamp commonly used to grade students’ written answers and is not usually recognized as hanamaru.

See also

○×クイズ  – true/false quiz confirmation in Japan
Check mark
Cherry blossom
Circle

Tic-tac-toe

References

Symbols